Tarik Yousef el-Magariaf is an economist who has worked as the chief executive of Silatech and as a member of the World Economic Forum's Global Agenda Council on the Arab World.  He specialises in economies of the Arab world.

Biography

Education
Yousef received his Ph.D. in Economics from Harvard University and his B.S. from the University of Oregon in Economics.

Career
Between 1998 and 2006, Yousef worked at Georgetown University, where he was Assistant Professor of Economics in the Edmund Walsh School of Foreign Service and Sheikh Al Salem Al Sabah Professor of Arab Studies at the Center for Contemporary Arab Studies.

Prior to joining Silatech in 2011, between 2007 and 2010 he served as the second dean of the Dubai School of Government (DSG), now known as Mohammed bin Rashid School of Government. DSG is a graduate school of public policy and international affairs. In late-2010, four out of the nine faculty members quit. This led to the end of Yousef's single term as Dean. DSG lost its academic accreditation and its Harvard affiliation.

During this period and up till present, Yousef has served as Senior Fellow at the Brookings Institution, where he co-founded with James Wolfensohn the Middle East Youth Initiative, an applied research and policy program.

Other work
He has worked in the past at the Middle East and Africa Department of the International Monetary Fund, as a Senior Advisor at the Millennium Project with the United Nations.

He was a participant in the second edition of Dubai Debates, on the topic After the Arab Awakening: Opportunities and Challenges for a New Arab World.

Personal life
He is the son of Mohamed Yousef el-Magariaf, Libya's former ambassador to India and the Secretary General of the 1980s group, the National Front for the Salvation of Libya.

Bibliography 
The Arab World Competitiveness Report 2007
Navtej Dhillon & Tarik Yousef, “Inclusion: Meeting the 100 Million Youth Challenge,” Middle East Youth Initiative, 2007
Navtej Dhillon & Tarik Yousef, Generation in Waiting: The Unfulfilled Promise of Young People in the Middle East, Brookings Institution, 2009

See also 
Middle East Youth Initiative

References 

Year of birth missing (living people)
Living people
American economists
Harvard Graduate School of Arts and Sciences alumni
University of Oregon alumni
Academic staff of Mohammed bin Rashid School of Government